Butterfly curve may refer to:

Butterfly curve (algebraic), a curve defined by a trinomial
Butterfly curve (transcendental), a curve based on sine functions

Mathematics disambiguation pages